Oleh Kramarenko (born 6 January 1956) is a former Ukrainian professional footballer.

Club career
He made his professional debut in the Soviet Second League in 1974 for FC Metalist Kharkiv.

European club competitions
With FC Dynamo Moscow.
 UEFA Cup 1976–77: 1 game.
 European Cup Winners' Cup 1977–78: 1 game.

References

1956 births
Footballers from Kharkiv
Living people
Ukrainian footballers
Soviet footballers
Association football midfielders
FC Metalist Kharkiv players
FC Dynamo Moscow players
Soviet Top League players
FC Dnipro players
FC Naftovyk-Ukrnafta Okhtyrka players
Ukrainian football managers